Coffee Prince is a 2012 Philippine television drama romance comedy series broadcast by GMA Network. The series is based on Sun-mi Lee's novel Coffee Prince. Directed by Ricky Davao, it stars Kris Bernal and Aljur Abrenica. It premiered nationally on October 8, 2012 on the network's Telebabad lineup replacing One True Love. The series concluded on November 23, 2012 with a total of 35 episodes. It was replaced by Pahiram ng Sandali in its timeslot.

Premise

Andy is a hardworking young woman who supports her mother and sister after the death of their father. To sustain their daily needs, she earns a living as a tricycle driver. Arthur, on the other hand, is a happy-go-lucky and wealthy bachelor whose family owns the biggest coffee factory in the country. His grandmother constantly pressures him to settle down, but Arthur is not yet ready to tie the knot.

To avoid the dates arranged by his domineering granny, Arthur hires Andy to pretend to be his gay lover. He doesn't know that Andy is just pretending to be a guy to keep her job in Arthur's coffee shop. Desperate to pay off her family's debt, Andy is left with no choice but to agree to Arthur's plan and to continue with her charade.

Complications arise when Andy starts to fall in love with Arthur. He is likewise unable to control his feelings for Andy and he starts questioning his sexuality.

Cast and characters

Lead cast
 Kris Bernal as Andrea "Andy" Gomez
Because of her tomboyish mannerism and ala "boy next door" looks, Andy always mistaken for a man. But in spite of this, Andy is the epitome of the loving and caring daughter and sister. She is the breadwinner of her family, trying every job to make ends meet and pay her family's outpouring debts. She ends up pretending as a guy to bag a job in a coffeehouse. She eventually falls in love with his boss, Arthur, who's unaware that she is actually a girl.
 Aljur Abrenica as Arthur Ochoa
Known for his happy-go-lucky and impulsive personality. As the heir to a huge coffee company, he struggles to meet all lofty expectations of him, particularly by his over domineering granny, Mamita. And to prove his worth, he ends up taking over a rundown old coffee shop, he named as "Coffee Prince". He is secretly in love with his brother's girlfriend. But unexpected turn of events will lead him to meet his perfect match.

Supporting cast
 Benjamin Alves as Errol Ochoa
The half-brother of impulsive Arthur. He is an established music producer and considered as the most favoured child in the family. His involvement with Arlene will cause a rift/rivalry between him and his brother, Arthur.
 Max Collins as Arlene Manahan
The girlfriend of Errol and Arthur's childhood sweetheart. With her kindness and sweet nature, she accidentally captured Arthur's heart, which eventually cause a rift between the two brothers. Her true personality comes out when she is with her Errol. She is possessive, manipulative and whinny. The same happens with Arthur. Thus, one of the reasons why Arthur decided to end their relationship.
 Celia Rodriguez as Mamita Ochoa
The Ochoa matriarch, known for her perfectionist, bossy and controlling nature. She is considered as one of the most respected and well-known businesswoman in the world of food business. Mamita is very proud of her humble beginnings. It was only through hard work and diligence that she was able to achieve all the luxuries in life – things she also expects for her grandson, Arthur to follow.
 Tessie Tomas as Elizabeth "Beth" Gomez
A widow who raises her daughters Andy and Mylene the best way she knows. Desperation for money forces her to rely on easy money schemes but always ends up running to Andy to bail her out of trouble.
 Leo Martinez as Ernie Muling Tapang
Arthur's business partner in coffeehouse and also serves as the senior barista there. His ill-tempered and fearless nature seems useless when it comes to Beth, whom he has a secret crush.
 Ces Quesada as Lorna Ochoa
Arthur and Errol's mother. Lorna will do everything she can to keep her family intact. She will eventually resent Andy for his son Arthur.
 Ronnie Henares as Oliver Ocgolhoa
The business-minded father of Arthur and Errol. He is somewhat a disciplinarian, but seems biased when it comes to his two sons, as he always compares the happy-go-lucky Arthur to the goody-good Errol. He often doubts Arthur's ability and worth, convinced that his youngest son is nothing but a freeloader.
 Boy2 Quizon as Ervin Tanchinko
The best friend and confidante of Arthur. He works at Arthur's coffee shop as interior designer and barista.
 Steven Silva as Bamboo Buendia
Errol's best friend.
 Fabio Ide as Leo Bonito
A Brazilian national who used to sell Brazilian desserts in the mall. He applied as a barista in Coffee Prince in order to finish his studies.
 Sef Cadayona as Baldo
The suitor of Andy's sister, Mylene. He also works as a barista in Coffee Prince and the only one besides Ernie who knows the secret behind Andy's identity.
 Kim Rodriguez as Mylene Gomez
The younger sister of Andy.

Background

Coffee Prince is a 2007 Korean drama series starring Yoon Eun-hye, Gong Yoo, Lee Sun-kyun and Chae Jung-an. It is based on Lee Sun-mi's novel of the same title. It was originally broadcast in South Korea by MBC on July 2, 2007 and concluded on August 28, 2007. It became one of the most popular series in Korea that year, garnering high ratings and winning several awards, including Best TV Drama at the 20th Korean Producers' Award; Best TV Actress and Best New TV Director at the 44th Baeksang Arts Awards for Yoon Eun-hye and Lee Yoon-jung, respectively; Top Excellence in Acting and Excellence in Acting awards for Yoon Eun-hye and Gong Yoo, respectively, and PD Award for Kim Chang-wan at the 2007 MBC Drama Awards.

From January 1 to March 19, 2008, GMA Network aired the series, and just like in South Korea, it spawned a huge following and fascination among Filipinos, and is considered as one of the best Korean series the network has aired.

Overview

Production and development
On September 26, 2008, in an intimate lunch with the press people, GMA Network's lady executives, headed by [the now retired] Wilma Galvante, shared their plans for the rest of 2008 and for the first quarter of 2009. Galvante announced that the network has bought the format rights of Coffee Prince to produce the local version.

Since then, excitement reaches the series' fanatics, as well as, the loyal viewers of the network. There were plenty of speculations as to whom the network would choose to lead the Filipino version of the said series. Actresses, Jolina Magdangal, Carla Abellana, Chynna Ortaleza and Sheena Halili were some of the names reportedly vying for the female lead role. In one of her interviews [on entertainment news website, Philippine Entertainment Portal or PEP dated August 20, 2010], Abellana denies the rumor, but said she loves to do certain roles [tomboy/lesbian]. "I've tried acting as a tomboy in Carinderia Queen last year [2010], and I loved it! Many told me that the role fits me," says Abellana.
 		
There's also a speculation that the said project is intended for Dennis Trillo and Jennica Garcia. In one of his interviews [on PEP, dated April 26, 2009], Trillo confirmed that his next project after the fantasy-adventure series, Gagambino, should be the local adaptation of Coffee Prince. But unfortunately, the network had decided to shelve the project for the moment, as they want to concentrate more on original materials. And so, Trillo and Garcia made the romantic-comedy series Adik Sa'Yo, instead.

July 2012, the network bosses announced that they are back to the drawing board for Coffee Prince, and this time, with Aljur Abrenica and Kris Bernal in the lead. This was after the network shelved the supposedly reunion project of Abrenica and Bernal with Rhian Ramos, the straight-drama entitled Sana Dalawa ang Puso Ko (lit. I Hope I Have Two Hearts).

The production team wants to deliver the series as a real Filipino television series rather than just a remake of an original Korean show. Screenwriter, Des Garbes Severino assigned as the headwriter of the series. While there are many similarities to the original series, some changes were made by adding more interesting twists and turns, new characters and Pinoy flavour to it. "When we adapt, we get the main story or the main premise. Most of the major plotlines are intact. We adapt it to our local setting. For instance, in the original version, Andy is a delivery girl. But we're not familiar with that, although we do have delivery boys. So we've made her a tricycle driver. If you notice, the Korean version, though a romance-comedy, is more on light romance. This time around, we explore the concept of romantic comedy. There will be funny scenes along with heartwarming moments," Severino shares. She also admits that doing an adaptation is quite challenging. The creative people behind Coffee Prince are also faced with the task to make the story, given the character arcs, more interesting and better than the original. "Die-hard fans, who know every twist and turn of the story, won’t get disappointed because the iconic scenes such as Arthur carrying Andy on his back and he running after her from condo to restaurant asking for apology will be there,"she added. The producer hired actor/director Ricky Davao to handle the series.

Casting
Coffee Prince served as Abrenica and Bernal's reunion project and first romantic-comedy series in GMA. In preparing for the role, Bernal said she really had to study how a real man acts and respond to situations before she went in front of the cameras. She even learned how to drive a tricycle and even willing to cut her hair short to make her role more realistic. Bernal added that she really ensures she gets to familiarize with every scene for each episode. Abrenica, on the other hand, couldn't be any happier to reignite his onscreen chemistry with Bernal, stated that their relationship as onscreen partners is incomparable and deep. He added that he's very comfortable with Bernal so there's no big adjustment between them. When it comes to his role, he considered it as his most challenging role so far. "I made character research here. There's a part in the story that I will question my sexuality. That's quite challenging for me," he added. Both Bernal and Abrenica underwent several workshops under Director Maryo J. Delos Reyes before the cameras roll,  in preparation for their characters. Series' director, Ricky Davao is all praise for his lead casts, described that Bernal is a delight to work with and Abrenica is quite serious [on his work] and very sensitive. "I'm very happy with my cast, they are all good and they fit into their roles," he added. Davao also had a short cameo appearance in the show. He played Mando, Andy's loving father.

Benjamin Alves and Max Collins were assigned to play Errol and Arlene's characters. Alves relates himself to his role, said that: "[Like Errol...] I'm responsible, and I know what needs to be done. I take every bit of information in before I express myself -- but, this is due to character's sad back story, which involves Collins' character breaking his heart," he says.

The show revolved not only on the main character's comical romance, but also at the fictional coffee shop called Coffee Prince, and its baristas. One of those is Boy 2 Quizon who played Ervin. Quizon stated that it's his first gay role and naming Hollywood's Chris Colfer as his peg. "Actually, it was a concept of our director, Ricky Davao. He wants me to do this. It's fine with me, because I don't wanna limit my acting ability," he added. Sef Cadayona originally auditioned for Ervin, but ended up portraying Baldo. He was told by the producers that it was better for him to play Baldo role, as he already played gay character in 2011 primetime series, Time of My Life which also starred Bernal.

Shared equally vital roles in the series are veteran actors, Tessie Tomas who played Beth, Andy and Mylene's mother. This series marked as Tomas’ comeback project for the network after four years. While her contemporary and Champoy co-star, Leo Martinez played Arthur's business partner, Manong Ernie. Ronnie Henares and Ces Quesada portrayed Oliver and Lorna, respectively, Arthur and Errol's parents; Celia Rodriguez played Errol and Arthur's strict and domineering grandmother, Mamita.

Filming
The teaser/plug was filmed in a studio at GMA Network Center in Quezon City. It was actually an omnibus plug for the network's set of primetime shows for the last quarter of 2012, entitled "Ang Tahanan ng mga Dramang Inyong Mamahalin" (lit. Home of the Dramas That You Will Love). The series' production began on September 18, 2012. Many of the series' scenes were shot on location in Batangas, which considered as the coffee capital of the Philippines. Executive producer, Michele Borja said that most of the scenes taking place in Barangay Barako [the fictional town where the female protagonist lives], were filmed in Talisay, Batangas. While some of the scenes, including the male protagonist condo unit and the "resto scenes" were filmed entirely at Midas Hotel and Casino in Pasay. The fictional "Coffee Prince" coffee shop scenes were shot entirely at The Green Olive Club in Kabangaan, Tagaytay, Cavite. Filming locations were chosen by the director, executive producer and production designer, Paul Infante.

Reception

Ratings
According to AGB Nielsen Philippines' Mega Manila household television ratings, the pilot episode of Coffee Prince earned a 21.8% rating. While the final episode scored a 23.3% rating.

Critical reception
Manila Times' Ed Uy said that "Kris Bernal and Aljur Abrenica give endearing performances in the Filipino remake of Koreanovela Coffee Prince". While writer, Jojo Gabinete of Abante Tonight said that Bernal and Alves have a strong chemistry onscreen. Remate's showbiz writer, Pete Ampoloquio, Jr. reviews... "it's an unassailable fact that they do have chemistry and it's one of the reasons why their tandem is well-followed and successful". Yahoo! OMG said "With her lead role in the Pinoy version of Koreanovela Coffee Prince, Kris Bernal is definitely one to watch".

References

External links
 

2012 Philippine television series debuts
2012 Philippine television series endings
Filipino-language television shows
GMA Network drama series
Philippine romantic comedy television series
Philippine television series based on South Korean television series
Television series set in restaurants
Television shows set in the Philippines